Lady Nugent was built at Bombay in 1813. She made four voyages under contract to the British East India Company (EIC). She then made two voyages transporting convicts to Australia, one to New South Wales and one to Van Diemen's Land (Tasmania). She also made several voyages with emigrants to New Zealand under charter to the New Zealand Company or the Canterbury Association. She foundered in May 1854 with the loss of some 400 persons, most of them soldiers that she was carrying from Madras to Rangoon.

Career
Between 1814 and 1825 Lady Nugent engaged in private trade to India under a license from the EIC. Caledonian Mercury (Edinburgh, Scotland), 13 May 1815; Issue 14575.</ref>

EIC voyage #1 (1819)
Captain R. Swanston sailed from Madras, bound for London. Lady Nugent left Madras on 20 April 1819. She reached St Helena on 17 September, and arrived at Spithead on 26 November.

When , Scott, master, originally bound from Calcutta to Malta, was condemned in March 1822, her cargo was transhipped on Lady Nugent. At the time, Lady Nugent was expected to sail from Calcutta in May.

On 18 May 1822 a hurricane at  caught Lady Nugent. She survived after having jettisoned a third of her cargo, but had to put back to Bengal. She had five feet of water in her hold, which ruined more than another third of the cargo. This same storm had caused  to founder with the loss of most of the people on board.

Captain Robert Boon was Lady Nugents master in 1823.

On 12 May 1824 Lady Nugent was at the Cape of Good Hope.

In 1825 Lady Nugent became a "Free Trader".

EIC voyage #2 (1825–1826)
Between 26 March 1825 and 28 October 1826,  Madras and Bengal. Captain William Wimble.

On 19 June 1827 Lady Nugent put into Portsmouth for repairs after having developed leaks on her way to Bengal.

EIC voyage #3 (1829–1830)
Captain John Wimble sailed from Portsmouth on 15 July 1829, bound for Bengal. Lady Nugent arrived at Calcutta on 7 December. Homeward bound, she was at Kedgeree on 30 March 1830, and arrived at Gravesend on 22 September.

EIC voyage #4 (1831–1832)
Between 20 March 1831 and 1832 Lady Nugent sailed to Madras and Bengal.

Convicts to New South Wales (1833–1834)
Captain Joseph Henry Fawcett sailed from Sheerness on 4 December 1834 and arrived at Sydney on 9 April 1835. She had embarked 286 male convicts, two of whom died on the voyage. Left for Batavia in May.

Convicts to Van Diemen's Land (1836)
Captain Fawcett sailed Lady Nugent from Sheerness on 14 July 1836. She sailed via the Cape and arrived at Hobart Town on 11 November. She had embarked 286 male convicts, none of whom died on the voyage.

Emigrants to New ZealandLloyd's Register for 1841 (published in 1840), shows Lady Nugents master changing from Fawcett to Santry, and her owner from Somes to Haviside. Her trade changed from London, to London—New Zealand.

The New Zealand Company chartered Lady Nugent in 1840. Captain James Santry sailed on 21 October 1840 bound for Wellington with 263 emigrants. She arrived at 17 March 1841. On 6 August Lady Nugent arrived at Calcutta from New Zealand and Madras.Lloyd's Register for 1846 shows Santry as master, Haviside, owner, and trade: London. It also shows that she was rebuilt in 1843.

Between 7 December 1849 and 26 March 1850, Captain John Parsons transported emigrants to New Zealand.

On 30 May 1851 Lady Nugent sailed from London to Lyttelton under Captain John Parsons with Canterbury Association settlers, arriving on 18 September. She then sailed to Nelson, reaching there on 23 October. She arrived at Port Jackson from New Zealand on 7 December. By this time, her master was David Frazer.

Fate
On 10 May 1854 Lady Nugent sailed from Madras for Rangoon, with Lt. Col. Johnstone, four other officers and 350 other ranks, all of the 25th Regiment of Madras Native Infantry, as well as 20 women and children, and a crew of 34. During her voyage Lady Nugent'' foundered in a hurricane with the loss of everyone on board.

Citations

References
 
 
 

1814 ships
British ships built in India
Age of Sail merchant ships
Merchant ships of the United Kingdom
Convict ships to Tasmania
Convict ships to New South Wales
Maritime incidents in May 1822
Maritime incidents in May 1854
Migrant ships to New Zealand